This list of the National Road Network of Costa Rica contains every national route in Costa Rica. It is generated from the official maps from the Ministry of Public Works and Transport.

List of national routes

References